Callirrhoe (Greek: Καλλιρρόη), also known as , is one of Jupiter's outer natural satellites. It is an irregular moon that orbits in a retrograde direction. Callirrhoe was imaged by Spacewatch at Kitt Peak National Observatory from October 6 through November 4, 1999, and originally designated as asteroid . It was discovered to be in orbit around Jupiter by Tim Spahr on July 18, 2000, and then given the designation . It was the 17th confirmed moon of Jupiter.

Name 

It was named in October 2002 after Callirrhoe, daughter of the river god Achelous, one of Zeus' (Jupiter's) many conquests.

Characteristics 
Callirrhoe has an apparent magnitude of 20.7, making it even fainter than dwarf planet Eris at magnitude 18.7. Jupiter is about 2.5 billion times brighter than Callirrhoe.

Callirrhoe is about 9.6 kilometers in diameter, and orbits Jupiter at an average distance of 24.1 million kilometers in 747.09 days, at an inclination of 141° to the ecliptic (140° to Jupiter's equator) with an eccentricity of 0.28.  This object was probably captured long ago from a heliocentric orbit and the Sun's gravitational influence makes this orbit highly erratic.

It belongs to the Pasiphae group, irregular retrograde moons orbiting Jupiter at distances ranging between 22.8 and 24.1 million kilometers, and with inclinations ranging between 144.5° and 158.3°. However, while Pasiphae is gray (B−V=0.74, V−R=0.38, V−I=0.74) in color, Callirrhoe is light red (B−V=0.72, V−R=0.50, V−I=1.02) and more similar to Megaclite.

Exploration 

As a navigation exercise, the New Horizons spacecraft imaged Callirrhoe on January 10, 2007.

Notes

References

External links 
 17th Moon of Jupiter Discovered
 Spacewatch S/1999 J 1
 Spacewatch discovery picture

Pasiphae group
Moons of Jupiter
Irregular satellites
Astronomical objects discovered in 1999
Moons with a retrograde orbit